The Movie Monster Game is a computer game released by Epyx for the Apple II and Commodore 64 in 1986. The game offers a variety of scenarios, playable monsters, and cities to demolish (complete with famous landmarks, such as Tokyo Tower, Eiffel Tower, Statue of Liberty, Golden Gate Bridge, Saint Basil's Cathedral and Big Ben). The monsters are based on popular movie monsters such as The Blob, Mothra, the Stay Puft Marshmallow Man, and the Transformers, and Epyx was able to officially license Godzilla.

Gameplay

The gameplay is depicted on a movie screen in front of a movie theater crowd simulating an actual monster movie. Each scenario even starts off with an advertisement, (for popcorn and "Gummi Glogs"; in the Apple II version "Godzilla Mouthwash" is also featured), and other attractions, (such as promotions for Epyx's own Summer Games) before the "Feature Presentation" of the game begins.

The game includes 5 different scenarios for the player to play through:

Berserk. The player must accumulate a certain number of points by destroying as many buildings and vehicles as possible.
Escape. The player must flee the city before being killed by the military.
Search. The player must use the monster to rescue its offspring hidden in a building. Godzilla's son is depicted as Minilla.
Destroy Landmark. The player must destroy a specific landmark within the city such as the Statue of Liberty in New York City, the Tokyo Tower in Tokyo, Big Ben in London, etc.
Lunch. The player must satisfy the monster's hunger by eating vehicles and civilians until the monster's hunger meter is depleted.

The monsters are Godzilla, Sphectra (a giant wasp), The Glog (a huge green blob with red eyes), Tarantus (a giant Tarantula), Mr. Meringue (a knock-off of the Stay Puft Marshmallow Man), and Mechatron (a knock-off of Topspin from Transformers).

The cities featured in the game are New York City, San Francisco, London, Tokyo, Moscow, and Paris.

Reception

In Dragon #114's "The Role of Computers" column, reviewers Hartley and Pattie Lesser stated that "This is a game that is a great deal of fun to play!"

Computer Gaming World said that The Movie Monster Game "gets a little tedious after a while".

Reviews
Zzap! (Dec, 1986)
Happy Computer (Dec, 1986)
Commodore User (Dec, 1986)
Computer Gamer (Jan, 1987)

See also
Crush, Crumble and Chomp!

References

External links

1986 video games
Apple II games
Commodore 64 games
Epyx games
Godzilla games
Kaiju video games
Video games developed in the United States

Single-player video games